West Days is an unincorporated community located in DeSoto County, Mississippi, United States.

References

Unincorporated communities in DeSoto County, Mississippi
Unincorporated communities in Mississippi
Memphis metropolitan area